The JoongAng Seoul Marathon is an annual footrace that takes place in Seoul, South Korea, usually in early November. First held in 1999, the race was established as a commemoration of Olympic marathon race which was held as part of the 1988 Seoul Olympics. It features a men's marathon elite race, and also has non-professional races of 10 km as well as the marathon distance. Elite international competitors are usually not invited to the women's race, thus that section tends to be a competition between Korean women only.

Sponsored by JoongAng Ilbo, the JoongAng Seoul Marathon one of two annual international marathons in the city: the Seoul International Marathon is held in March and is sponsored by rival newspaper The Dong-a Ilbo. It has received IAAF Bronze Label Road Race status and hosted the Asian Marathon Championship in 2004.

It began as a half marathon with around 1300 participants in the first run. The course was selected as a national championship race from 2001 onwards and it became a full marathon course the following year. A 5 km short course event was held at the inaugural edition and it featured for three years until its discontinuation in 2002. In 2007 it was awarded Silver Label Race Road status by the IAAF and by 2008 around 25,000 runners were competing at each annual event.

Tracing a loop across Seoul, the course is generally flat, which allows for fast finishing times. It takes place in the south-east part of the city, heading into the suburbs towards Seongnam before looping back to finish in the Jamsil Olympic Stadium. The fast course has resulted in a number of sub-2:09 runs and even one sub-2:06 run in the men's race over the course's history. James Kwambai is the men's course record holder with 2:05:50 hours and is the most successful athlete at the race, having won three times consecutively from 2011 to 2013. The women's course record is 2:29:32 hours, set by national runner Lee Eun-Jung.

Past winners

Half marathon

Marathon
Key:

References

External links
Official website



JTBC
Marathons in South Korea
Athletics in South Korea
Sport in Seoul
Recurring sporting events established in 1999
1999 establishments in South Korea
Autumn events in South Korea